The Miss South Dakota competition is the pageant that selects the representative for the U.S. state of South Dakota in the Miss America pageant.

With Alaska became the latest state crowned the Miss America title, South Dakota is one of the few states along with Maine, West Virginia and Wyoming that has yet to win a Miss America, Miss USA, or Miss Teen USA title.

Hunter Widvey of Rapid City was crowned Miss South Dakota 2022 on June 4, 2022 at the Oscar Performing Art Center in Brookings, South Dakota. She competed for the title of Miss America 2023 at the Mohegan Sun in Uncasville, Connecticut in December 2022 where she was a Women in STEM Finalist.

Results summary
The following is a visual summary of the past results of Miss South Dakota titleholders at the national Miss America pageants/competitions. The year in parentheses indicates the year of the national competition during which a placement and/or award was garnered, not the year attached to the contestant's state title.

Placements
 1st runners-up: Irene O'Connor (1951)
 Top 10: Marlene Rieb (1952), Mary Harum (1971), Barbara Guthmiller (1975)
 Top 15: Alexandra Hoffman (2009)

Awards

Preliminary awards
 Preliminary Lifestyle and Fitness: Marlene Rieb (1952)
 Preliminary Talent: Irene O'Connor (1951), Delores Jerde (1954)

Non-finalist awards
 Non-finalist Talent: Delores Jerde (1954), Ann McKay (1969), Karen Janousek (1978), Julie Kleinsasser (1980), Sara Frankenstein (1999)

Other awards
 Dr. David B. Allman Medical Scholarship: Angela Casey (1994), Kimberlee McKay (1996)
 Social Impact Initiative Scholarship Award 2nd runners-up: Amber Hulse (2020)
 Women in Business Scholarship Award Winners: Carrie Wintle (2019)
 Women in STEM Finalists: Hunter Widvey (2023)

Winners

Notes

References

External links
 Miss South Dakota official website

South Dakota
South Dakota culture
Women in South Dakota
Annual events in South Dakota